Richard, 4th Prince of Sayn-Wittgenstein-Berleburg (27 May 1882 – 25 April 1925) was Prince of Sayn-Wittgenstein-Berleburg from 1904 to 1918.

Life
Prince Richard was born on 27 May 1882 at Berleburg, Germany.

On 21 November 1902, at Langenzell, he married Princess Madeleine of Löwenstein-Wertheim-Freudenberg, daughter of Prince Alfred of Löwenstein-Wertheim-Freudenberg and Countess Pauline von Reichenbach-Lessonitz.
 
His title was de-recognized by the Weimar and other German Republics after abolition of the German Empire in 1918 but lawfully retained henceforth as a surname. 

He died as the result of a traffic accident in Hanau on 25 April 1925 at age 42.

Issue
Gustav Albrecht, 5th Prince of Sayn-Wittgenstein-Berleburg, b. 28 Feb 1907, d. 1944 (declared dead in 1969 after being missing in action in Russia, 1944)
Christian Heinrich, 6th Prince of Sayn-Wittgenstein-Hohenstein, b. 20 Sep 1908, d. 17 Aug 1983
Prince Ludwig Ferdinand, b. 4 Apr 1910, d. 22 Nov 1943

References

1882 births
1925 deaths
Princes of Sayn-Wittgenstein-Berleburg
Members of the Prussian House of Lords
Road incident deaths in Germany